This community was formerly named White Hall, see White Hall, Arkansas for the modern day community.
Whitehall, Arkansas (formerly White Hall) is an unincorporated community in Scott Township, Poinsett County, Arkansas, United States. Whitehall is located at the intersection of Arkansas Highway 1 and Arkansas Highway 214.

References

Unincorporated communities in Poinsett County, Arkansas
Unincorporated communities in Arkansas